Aleksandr Tutakayev (born 10 September 1943) is a Soviet swimmer who won a silver medal in the 200 m breaststroke at the 1966 European Aquatics Championships. He competed at the 1964 Summer Olympics in the 200 m breaststroke and 4 × 100 m medley relay and finished in fourth place in both events.

Tutakayev lived most of his life in Tbilisi, Georgia, but in the 1990s–2000s moved to Rzhev, Russia, where he works as a swimming coach for children.

References

1943 births
Living people
Male swimmers from Georgia (country)
Soviet male swimmers
Male breaststroke swimmers
Swimmers at the 1964 Summer Olympics
Olympic swimmers of the Soviet Union
European Aquatics Championships medalists in swimming
Sportspeople from Tbilisi